This is a list of current and former Roman Catholic churches in the Roman Catholic Diocese of San Jose in California. The diocese comprises Santa Clara County, California and includes approximately 53 churches divided for administrative purposes into six deaneries.

The Cathedral Basilica of St. Joseph in downtown San Jose is the cathedral church of the diocese. The diocese also includes Mission Santa Clara de Asís, a Spanish mission founded in 1777 and located on the campus of Santa Clara University.

Deanery 2: Northwest (Los Altos, Mountain View, Palo Alto)

Deanery 3: Central (San Jose, Santa Clara, Sunnyvale)

Deanery 4: Northeast (Aviso, Milpitas, San Jose)

Deanery 5: South Central (Campbell, Cupertino, Los Gatos, Saratoga)

Deanery 6: West (San Jose)

Deanery 7: South (Gilroy, Morgan Hill, San Jose)

References

 
San Jose